Tube system may refer to:

Tube (structure), a building structural system
Rapid transit, an underground tube system
London Underground, also nicknamed the Tube, a rapid transit system in London, England